Kahgan-e Olya (also Romanized as Kāhgān-e ‘Olyā) is a village in Poshtkuh-e Mugui Rural District, in the Central District of Fereydunshahr County, Isfahan Province, Iran. At the 2006 census, its population was 136, in 32 families.

References 

Populated places in Fereydunshahr County